Providence Grove High School (often abbreviated as PGHS) is a high school located in Climax, North Carolina, United States. It is part of the Randolph County School System.

References

External links 
 Official website. Received April 17, 2019

Public high schools in North Carolina
Schools in Randolph County, North Carolina